Trotsky Vengarán (also known as TKYVGN) is an Uruguay rock band formed in 1991, by Guillermo Peluffo, lead singer, Hugo Diaz and Ignacio Guasch on guitars, Guillermo "Cuico" Perazzo on drums and Marcelo Abreu on bass. Since the very beginning they decided they were going to play hard and melodic rock.  They were influenced by groups such as Ramones, Beastie Boys, AC/DC, Sex Pistols and other 50's and 60's bands.
Their style is clearly defined as punk rock, but with hardcore characteristics. The themes in their songs vary greatly, dealing with political, social, and cultural everyday issues.  In 1994 they released their first album, called Salud, Dinero y Dinero (Health, Money and Money). ".

Members

Current members 
Guillermo Peluffo - singer (1991–present)
Hugo Diaz - guitar (1991–present)
Guillermo Perazzo - drums (1991–present)
Juan Pablo Granito Virè - Bass (2014 - present)

Past members 
Héctor Souto - bass (2001–2014)
Marcelo Abreu - bass (1991–1995)
Ignacio Guasch - guitar (1991–1995)
Felipe Di Stefani - bass (1995–1997)
Nicolás Pequera - bass (1997–2001)

Discography

Studio albums 
Salud, dinero y dinero (1994)
Clase B (1996)
Yo no fui (1999)
Durmiendo afuera (2001)
Todo lo contrario (2002)
7 veces mal (2005)
Hijo del rigor (2006)
Volumen 10 (2008)
Todo para ser feliz (2010)
Colección Histórica (2012)
Cielo Salvaje (2013)
Relajo pero con orden (2016)
Los Valientes (2018)

Live albums 
Pogo (2003)
No estamos solos (2007)
Juegues donde juegues (2015)
Una noche de rock en Medallo (2020)

Videoclips 
Reflejo (Salud, dinero y dinero)
Mueve que te mueve (Salud, dinero y dinero)
Un beso y una flor (Clase b)
Tu lugar (Clase b)
Por vos (Yo no fuí)
Tocando fondo (Yo no fuí)
Una vez más (Durmiendo afuera)
Todo puede estar mucho peor (Todo lo contrario)
Historias sin terminar (Todo lo contrario)
Ni olvido ni perdón (Pogo)
3 veces mal (7 veces mal)
La tierna pesadilla (Hijo del rigor)
Noche alucinante (Volumen 10)
Llueve (Volumen 10)
Noche de Rock (Todo para ser feliz)
Dejate Llevar (Todo para ser feliz)
En el final (Cielo salvaje)
Cielo salvaje (Cielo salvaje)
Ellos me buscan a mí (Relajo pero con orden)

DVD 
Pogo (2003)
No estamos solos (2008)
Juegues donde juegues (2015)
Relajo pero con orden (2016)

References

External links 
 

Uruguayan musical groups